Liparophyllum is a genus of aquatic flowering plants in the family Menyanthaceae. The name Liparophyllum comes from the Greek words liparos, meaning "fat, shiny or oily", and phyllon, meaning "leaf". They are rhizomatous wetland plants with alternate linear leaves. Flowers occur singly, and are five-parted and white.

Selected species
 L. capitatum (Nees) Tippery & Les
 L. congestiflorum (F.Muell.) Tippery & Les
 L. exaltatum (Sol. ex Sims) Tippery & Les
 L. exiguum (F.Muell.) Tippery & Les
 L. gunnii Hook.f. (type)
 L. lasiospermum (F.Mueller) Tippery & Les
 L. latifolium (Benth.) Tippery & Les
 L. violifolium (F.Muell.) Tippery & Les
List source :

References

Menyanthaceae
Asterales genera